The Jorma Panula Conducting Competition, is a music competition for young European conductors held in Vaasa, (Finland).

History	
The first competition, named after the conductor and conducting professor Jorma Panula, was organized in 1999 with the idea of being a platform for young conductors starting their professional careers.  The president of the Jury is Jorma Panula and the jury includes several musicians such as Olari Elts, Karsten Witt and Atso Almila. During the competition the contestants conduct the Sinfonia Finlandia and the Vaasa City Orchestra.

Winners
 2015 First Prize: Dylan Corlay. Second Prize: Elena Schwarz.
 2012 Second Prize: Risto Joost and Tobias Vokmann.
 2009 First Prize: Yordan Kamdzhalov. Second Prize: Martins Ozolins. Third prize: Adriel Donghyuk Kim.
 2006 First Prize: Vytautas Lukocius. Second Prize: Sylvain Gasançon.
 2003 First Prize: Eeva Ollikainen. Second Prize: Lilyan Kaiv.
 1999 First Prize: Olari Elts. Second Prize: Tibor Bogányi.

References

External links

Conducting competitions